Translucent Flashbacks is a compilation album released in 1995 that combines the first three Spacemen 3 singles and their B-sides. The singles, which were released on Glass Records between 1986 and 1988, are "Walkin' With Jesus", the Transparent Radiation EP and "Take Me To The Other Side".

Different versions of many of these tracks can actually be found on The Perfect Prescription album with one track, "Rollercoaster," available on the debut Sound of Confusion album.

A version of this album was also released in the US by Taang! records and called Spacemen 3 The Singles; although this version's booklet gives no dates for the singles' releases and no information on the band, it features what may have been the original artwork for the individual record covers.

Track listing 
Walkin with Jesus (Sound of Confusion) (Nov 1986)

Transparent Radiation EP (July 1987)

Take Me To The Other Side (July 1988)

1995 compilation albums
Spacemen 3 albums
Fire Records (UK) compilation albums
Glass Records compilation albums